This is a list of teen dramas, which are dramatic television series with a major focus on teenage characters. Some shows on this list are also comedy-dramas.

Argentina 
  (2005–2006), Canal Trece
 Aliados (2013–2014), Telefe
 Alma pirata (2006), Telefe
 Atracción x4 (2008–2009), Canal Trece
 La banda del golden rocket (1991–1993), Canal Trece
 BIA (2019–2020), Disney Channel Latin America
  (2018), TPA
 Casi ángeles (2007–2010), Telefe
  (1987–1990), Canal Trece
  (2021–present), HBO Max
  (2001), Telefe
  (2004), Telefe
 Go! Live Your Way (2019), Netflix
 Heidi, bienvenida a casa (2017–2019), Nickelodeon Latin America
 Intertwined (2021–present), Disney+
 Kally's Mashup (2017–2019), Nickelodeon Latin America
 Once (2017–2019), Disney XD Latin America
  (2005), Canal 9
  (2012), Encuentro
 Rebelde Way (2002–2003), Canal 9
 El refugio (de los sueños) (2006), Canal Trece
 Rincón de luz (2003), Canal 9
 Romeo y Julieta (2008), Canal 9
 Secrets of Summer (2022–present), Netflix
  (1990), Canal 9
 Soy Luna (2016–2018), Disney Channel Latin America
 Tierra Incognita (2022–present), Disney+
 Sueña conmigo (2010–2011), Nickelodeon Latin America
 Verano del '98 (1998–2000), Telefe

Armenia
 Alien (2017), Shant TV
 Ellen's Diary (2017–2019), Shant TV

Australia 

 Bad Behaviour (2023), Stan
 Barracuda (2016), ABC
 Blue Water High (2005–2008), ABC
 Bump (2021–present), Stan
 Castaway (2010), Seven Network
 Class of '74 (1974–1975), Seven Network
 Crash Zone (1999–2001), Seven Network
 Cybergirl (2001–2002), Network Ten
 Dance Academy (2010–2013), ABC1, ABC3
 Dive Club (2021–present), 10 Shake
 Double Trouble (2008), ABC3
 Eugénie Sandler P.I. (2000), ABC
 Fatty & George (1981), ABC
 First Day (2020–2022), ABC Me
 Flunk (2018–present), YouTube
 Foreign Exchange (2004), Nine Network
 Grace Beside Me (2018), NITV
 The Girl From Tomorrow (1990), Nine Network
 The Girl From Tomorrow Part II: Tomorrow's End (1993), Nine Network
 A gURLs wURLd (2011), Nine Network
 Gymnastics Academy: A Second Chance! (2022–present), Netflix
 H2O: Just Add Water (2006–2010), Network Ten
 headLand (2005–2006), Seven Network
 Heartbreak High (1994–1999), Network Ten, ABC
 Heartbreak High (2022–present), Netflix
 The Heights (2019–2020), ABC
 The Henderson Kids (1985–1987), Network Ten
 Holly's Heroes (2005), Nine Network
 The Hunting (2019), SBS
 In Your Dreams (2013), Seven Network
 Itch (2019–present), ABC iView, ABC Me
 Lightning Point (2012), Network Ten
 Lockie Leonard (2007–2010), Nine Network
 The Lost Islands (1976), Network Ten
 Mako: Island of Secrets (2013–2016), Network Ten, Eleven
 MaveriX (2022–present), ABC Me
 Minty (1998), ABC
 Mirror, Mirror (1995), Network Ten
 Mirror, Mirror II (1997–1998), Network Ten
 Misery Guts (1998), ABC3
 More Than This (2022–present), Paramount+
 My Great Big Adventure (2012), ABC3
 The New Legends of Monkey (2018–2020), ABC Me
 The New Tomorrow (2005), Seven Network
 Noah and Saskia (2004), ABC
 Nowhere Boys (2013–2018), ABC3
 Ocean Girl (1994–1998), Network Ten
 Out There (2003–2004), ABC
 Outriders (2001), ABC3
 Parallax (2004), ABC, Nine Network
 The PM's Daughter (2022–present), ABC Me
 Puberty Blues (2012–2014), Network Ten
 Ready for This (2015), ABC3
 The Restless Years (1977–1981), Ten Network
 Rock Island Mysteries (2022), 10 Shake, Nickelodeon
 The Saddle Club (2001–2003), ABC1, Nine Network
 Sam Fox: Extreme Adventures (2014), Eleven
 Short Cuts (2001–2002), ABC3
 Silversun (2004), ABC
 Sky Trackers (1990–1994), Seven Network
 The Sleepover Club (2002–2009), Nine Network
 SLiDE (2011), Fox8
 Snobs (2003), Nine Network
 Spellbinder (1995), Nine Network
 Spellbinder: Land of the Dragon Lord (1997), Nine Network
 Stormworld (2009), Nine Network
 Streetsmartz (2005–2006), Nine Network
 Surviving Summer (2022–present), Netflix
 Sweat (1996), Network Ten
 Thunderstone (1999–2000), Network Ten
 Time Trackers (2008), Seven Network
 Tomorrow When the War Began (2016), ABC3
 Trapped (2008–2009), Seven Network
 The Unlisted (2019), ABC Me
 Wicked Science (2004–2006), Network Ten

Belgium
  (2021), 
  (2021–present), La Une
  (2014–2017), Ketnet
  (2020–2022), VRT
 Hotel Beau Séjour (2017–present), Eén
  (2019–present), Ketnet
 Skam France/Belgique (2018–present), La Trois, France 4, france.tv
  (2015–2017), VTM
 Spring (2002–2008), VRT
 WtFOCK (2018–2021), VIER, Play5, Streamz

Brazil 
 3% (2016–2020), Netflix
 All the Same... or Not (2022–present), Disney+
 Amigas & Rivais (2007–2008), SBT
 Back to 15 (2022–present), Netflix
  (1994–1996), TV Cultura
  (2003–2004), TV Cultura
 Juacas (2017–2019), Disney Channel Brazil
 Kissing Game (2020), Netflix
 Malhação (1995–2020), Rede Globo
 Mila in the Multiverse (2023–present), Disney+
  (2012–2014), TV Cultura
 Rebelde (2011–2012), RecordTV
 Sintonia (2019–present), Netflix
 Spectros (2020), Netflix
  (2022–present), Netflix
  (2009), TV Cultura
  (2018), Disney Channel Brazil, SBT

Bulgaria 
 Apartament 404 (2016–2017), Vbox7
 Az sŭm izi (2020), Vbox7
 #KIFLA (2016), Vbox7
 Kilerŭt (2018–2019), Vbox7
  (2016–2018), Vbox7
  (2018), Vbox7
  (2012–2014), BTV
  (2017–2019), Vbox7
  (2015–2019), Nova TV, Kino Nova
 Ubiĭ profesora (2019), Vbox7
 Undercover (2011–2016), BNT
 Us, Ours and Yours (2017), Nova TV
 Viral (2019), Vbox7

Canada 

 11 Somerset (2004–2005), Télé-Québec, A-Channel
 21 Thunder (2017), CBC
 2030 CE (2002–2003), YTV
 Anash and the Legacy of the Sun-Rock (2007), APTN
 Anne with an E (2017–2019), CBC
 Astrid & Lilly Save the World (2022), CTV Sci-Fi Channel
 Backstage (2016–2017), Family
 The Best Years (2007–2009), Global, E!, The N
 Between (2015–2016), City, Netflix
 Breaker High (1997–1998), YTV
 Dark Oracle (2004–2006), YTV
 Degrassi High (1989–1991), CBC, PBS
 Degrassi Junior High (1987–1989), CBC, PBS
 Degrassi: Next Class (2016–2017), Family, Netflix
 Degrassi: The Next Generation (2001–2015), CTV, MUCH, MTV Canada, TeenNick
 Detention Adventure (2019–present), CBC Gem
 Drop the Beat (2000), CBC
 Edgemont (2001–2005), CBC
 Endlings (2020–present), CBC
 Fakes (2022–present), CBC Gem
 Falcon Beach (2006–2007), Global, ABC Family
 Guinevere Jones (2002), YTV
 The Hardy Boys (2020–present), YTV
 Heartland (2007–present), CBC
 Higher Ground (2000), Fox Family
 Hillside (1991–1993), YTV, Nickelodeon
 Holly Hobbie (2018–present), Family
 Instant Star (2004–2008), CTV
 Kif-Kif (2006–2007), Radio-Canada
 Lost & Found Music Studios (2016–2017), Family
 Madison (1993–1997), Global
 Majority Rules! (2009–2010), Teletoon
 Mentors (1998–2002), Family
 My Perfect Landing (2020), Family
 My Secret Identity (1988–1991), CTV
 The Next Step (2013–2020), Family, CBC Gem
 Nomades (2019–2020), Ici TOU.TV
 Northwood (1991–1994), CBC
 Our Hero (2000–2002), CBC
 Les petits rois (2021), Ici TOU.TV
 Radio Free Roscoe (2003–2005), Family
 Ready or Not (1993–1997), Showtime, Disney Channel, Global
 ReBoot: The Guardian Code (2018), YTV, Netflix
 renegadepress.com (2004–2008), APTN
 The Rez (1996–1998), CBC
 Ride (2016), YTV
 Spirit Bay (1982–1987), CBC
 Straight Up (1996–1998), CBC
 Strange Days at Blake Holsey High (2002–2006), Global
 Topline (2022–present), CBC Gem
 Tower Prep (2010), Cartoon Network
 Trickster (2020), CBC
 Utopia Falls (2020), CBC Gem
 Vampire High (2001–2002), YTV
 Watatatow (1991–2005), Radio-Canada
 Whistler (2006–2007), CTV
 The Zack Files (2000–2002), YTV

Chile 
  (2003), TVN
  (2004), TVN
  (2007–2009), Canal 13
  (2003–2004), Mega
  (2010), Chilevisión
  (2018), TVN
  (2004–2005), TVN
  (2004–2012), Mega
  (2008–2009), Canal 13
 Corazón rebelde (2009), Canal 13
  (2011–2012), Mega
  (2010), Chilevisión
  (2005), Mega
  (2012), Chilevisión
  (2007–2008), Mega
  (2020), Amazon Prime Video, TVN
 Karkú (2007–2009), TVN, Nickelodeon Latin America
  (2005–2006), Mega
  (2002), Canal 13
  (2004–2005), Mega
  (2011), Chilevisión
  (2003), Mega

China 

  (2013), Youku
 Accidentally in Love (2018), Tencent Video, Mango TV
 Addicted (2016), iQIYI
  (2017), iQIYI
  (2014), Sohu TV
  (2018), iQIYI
 Blazing Teens (2006–2007), Youku, Bilibili
  (2020), Mango TV
  (2020), Youku
  (2018), Youku
  (2018), Hunan TV
  (2016), Sohu TV
 The Chang'an Youth (2020), Tencent Video, Mango TV
  (2019), iQIYI
  (1998), CCTV
  (2020), Youku
  (2018–2020), iQIYI
  (2017), Sohu TV, Mango TV
  (2018–2019), Tencent Video, Mango TV
  (2019), Youku
  (2021), Hunan TV, Mango TV
  (2022), iQIYI
  (2017), Hunan TV
  (2021), Tencent Video, Youku
  (2016), LeTV
  (2022), iQIYI
  (2020), Youku
  (2021), Tencent Video
  (2015), iQIYI
  (2017), Sohu TV
  (2018), Youku
 Go Go Squid! (2019–2021), ZJTV, Dragon TV
  (2019–2022), Hunan TV
  (2022), CCTV, iQIYI
  (2019–2021), Mango TV
  (2021), Youku
  (2022), iQIYI
  (2022), Tencent Video
 I Won't Get Bullied by Girls (2018), Youku
  (2019), Tencent Video
  (2022), Youku
  (2019), iQIYI
 A Little Reunion (2019), ZJTV, Dragon TV
 A Little Thing Called First Love (2019), Hunan TV
  (2019), Tencent Video
  (2020), Tencent Video
 A Love for Dilemma (2021), CCTV, Dragon TV, iQIYI
 Love O2O (2016), JSTV, Dragon TV
 A Love So Beautiful (2017), Tencent Video
 Lovely Us (2020), iQIYI
  (2017), Tencent Video
 Memory of Encaustic Tile (2022), Youku
 Meteor Garden (2018), Hunan TV
 Meteor Shower (2009–2010), Hunan TV
  (2015–2016), iQIYI
  (2018), iQIYI
 My Huckleberry Friends (2017–2018), iQIYI
  (2016), Sohu TV
 My Sunshine (2015), Dragon TV, JSTV, iQIYI
  (2017), Tencent Video
 The Oath of Love (2022), Hunan TV, Tencent Video
 Operation Love (2017), Dragon TV
 One and a Half Summer (2014), Dragon TV
  (2021), Tencent Video
 The Prince of Tennis (2019), Hunan TV
  (2019), Tencent Video, Mango TV
  (2019), Tencent Video, Mango TV
 Put Your Head on My Shoulder (2019), Tencent Video
  (2021), Youku
  (2019), iQIYI
  (2019), Mango TV
 Rush to the Dead Summer (2017), Hunan TV
 Shining for One Thing (2022), iQIYI
  (2021), Tencent Video
 Skate into Love (2020), Jiangsu TV, Zhejiang TV
  (2019), Tencent Video
  (2019), iQIYI
  (2018), Tencent Video
  (2016–2022), Tencent Video, WeTV
 Take My Brother Away (2018), Tencent Video
  (2017), LeTV
  (2019), Tencent Video
 Unrequited Love (2021), Mango TV
 Wait, My Youth (2019), Youku
  (2019), iQIYI
  (2017), Tencent Video
  (2017), Mango TV
 The Whirlwind Girl (2015), Hunan TV
  (2019), Mango TV
 With You (2016), iQIYI
 , (2017–2018), Tencent Video
  (2019), Tencent Video
  (2018), iQIYI
  (2021), iQIYI
 Shining for One Thing (2021), iQIYI

Colombia 
 Always a Witch (2019–2020), Netflix
 Al ritmo de tu corazón (2004), RCN Televisión
 Chica vampiro (2013), RCN Televisión
  (1994–1997), Canal 1
 Cumbia Ninja (2013–2015), Fox Latin America
 Eva Lasting (2023–present), Netflix
 Francisco el matemático (1999–2004), RCN Televisión
 Francisco el matemático: Clase 2017 (2017), RCN Televisión
 Hermosa niña (1998), Canal 1
 It Was Always Me (2022–present), Disney+
 The Low Tone Club (2023–present), Disney+
 Mamá también (2013–2014), RCN Televisión
 Noobees (2018–2020), Nickelodeon Latin America
  (2011), MTV Latin America
 The Queen of Flow (2018–present), Caracol Televisión
 The Road to Love (2019), Caracol Televisión
 Toni, la Chef (2015), Nickelodeon Latin America
 Yo soy Franky (2015), Nickelodeon Latin America

Denmark 
 Akavet (2020–present), DR Ultra
 Chosen (2022–present), Netflix
 Elves (2021–present), Netflix
 Er du på (2021–present), DR Ultra
 Flokken (2021–present), DR Ultra
 Guilty (2019–present), DR Ultra
 Heartless (2014–2015), Kanal 5
 Over Grænsen (2020–present), DR Ultra
 Kamikaze (2021), HBO Max
  (2012–2014), DR1
  (2012–2014), DR Ramasjang, DR Ultra
 The Rain (2018–2020), Netflix
  (2020–present), HBO Nordic, HBO Max
 Stikker (2020), DR Ultra
  (2020), DR1

Finland 
 Jag kommer (2020), 
 #lovemilla (2013–2014), Yle TV2

France 
 The 7 Lives of Lea (2022–present), Netflix
  (2022–present), France.tv Slash, France 5
 Ben et Thomas (2008), France 4
  (2008–2011), France 2
  (2012), France 2
 Clem (2010), TF1
 Code Lyoko: Evolution (2013), France 4
 Find Me in Paris (2018–2020), France Télévisions
 Girlsquad (2021–present), France.tv Slash
 Des jours meilleurs (2017–2018), France 4
  (2009), M6
  (1992), France 2
 Marie Antoinette (2022–present), Canal+
  (2019–present), France.tv Slash
 Mortel (2019–present), Netflix
 Parallels (2022–present), Disney+
 Résistance (2014), TF1
  (1993–1995), France 2
 Skam France/Belgique (2018–present), France 4, La Trois, France.tv Slash
  (2020), France.tv Slash
 Vampires (2020), Netflix
 Voltaire High (2021–present), Amazon Prime Video
 Yas & Rim (2018), YouTube

Germany 

 Allein gegen die Zeit (2010–2012), KiKa
 Almost Fly (2022–present), WarnerTV Serie
 Anna (1987), ZDF
 Binny and the Ghost (2013–2016), Disney Channel Germany
 Biohackers (2020–present), Netflix
 Clara (1993), ZDF
 Club der roten Bänder (2015–2017), VOX
 Country Girls (2017–2018), funk
 Dark (2017–2020), Netflix
 Druck (2018–present), funk
 Find Me in Paris (2018–2020), ZDF
 FREAKS (2018), funk
 Girl Cave (2017), funk
 Gute Zeiten, schlechte Zeiten (1992–present), RTL
 Hand aufs Herz (2010–2011), Sat.1, sixx
 Das Haus Anubis (2009–2012), Nickelodeon Germany
  (2020), Sky Atlantic
  (2018), funk
 Hotel 13 (2012–2014), Nickelodeon Germany
 How to Sell Drugs Online (Fast) (2019–present), Netflix
  (2021–present), 
  (2021–present), Netflix
 Manni, der Libero (1982), ZDF
 Mysterium (2021–present), KiKa
 Oliver Maass (1985), ZDF
 Para - Wir sind King (2021–present), TNT Serie
 Patrik Pacard (1984), ZDF
 Ron und Tanja (1990), ZDF
 Schloss Einstein (1998–present), KiKa
 Die Schule am See (1997–2000), ARD
  (2020–present), ZDFneo
  (2020), Syfy
  (2016–present), Nickelodeon Germany, Paramount+
 Theodosia (2022), ZDF
 Tribes of Europa (2021–present), Netflix
 Die Torpiraten (1998), Nickelodeon Germany
 We Are the Wave (2019), Netflix
  (2021–present), Amazon Prime Video
  (2016–2018), funk

Ghana 
 Things We Do for Love (2000–2004), GTV
 YOLO (2015–present), TV3

Greece 
 S1ngles (1, 2, 2½, 3) (2004–2008), Mega Channel
 Tamam (2014–2017), ANT1

Hong Kong
  (1981), Rediffusion Television
 All About Boy'z (2003), Now TV
 Aqua Heroes (2003), TVB
  (1992), Asia Television
 Dressage to Win (2008), TVB
  (2021), TVB
  (1990), Asia Television
 Hearts of Fencing (2003), TVB
  (2022), ViuTV
  (1981), Rediffusion Television
  (2019), ViuTV
  (2022), Viu
  (1980), Rediffusion Television
  (1981), TVB
  (1981), Rediffusion Television
  (2020), ViuTV
  (2022), ViuTV
  (1999–2012), RTHK
  (2021), ViuTV

India 

 4 the People (2015–2016), Asianet 
 AdhaFull (2016–2017), DD National
 Banegi Apni Baat (1993–1997), Zee TV 
 Best Friends Forever? (2012–2013), Channel V India
 The Buddy Project (2012–2014), Channel V India
 Class (2023–present), Netflix
 Class of 2017 (2017), ALTBalaji
 Class of 2020 (2020), ZEE5, ALTBalaji
 Confessions of an Indian Teenager (2013–2014), Channel V India
 Crash Course (2022–present), Amazon Prime Video
 Crazy Stupid Ishq (2013), Channel V India
Crushed (2022–present), Amazon miniTV
 CyberSquad (2017), ALTBalaji
 D4 - Get Up and Dance (2016), Channel V India
 Dil Se Dosti (2001), Sony Entertainment Television
 Engga Hostel (2023–present), Amazon Prime Video
 Fanaah (2014–2015), MTV India
 Flames (2018–2019), The Viral Fever
 Friends: Conditions Apply (2014–2015), Channel V India
 Girls on Top (2016), MTV India
 Gumrah: End of Innocence (2012–2016), Channel V India
 Happy Go Lucky (2005), STAR One
 Hello Dollie (2004–2005), Star Plus
 Hip Hip Hurray (1998–2001), Zee TV
 Humse Hai Liife (2011–2012), Channel V India
 Ishaan: Sapno Ko Awaaz De (2010–2011), Disney Channel India
 Ishq Unplugged (2016), Channel V India
 It's Complicated: Relationships Ka Naya Status (2013–2014), Channel V India
 Jersey No. 10 (2007–2008), SAB TV
 Jhalli Anjali Ke Tootey Dil Ki Amazing Story (2014), Channel V India
 Just Mohabbat (1996–2000), Sony Entertainment Television
 Kaisi Yeh Yaariaan (2014–2018), MTV India, Voot
 Kallikattu Pallikoodam (2009–2010), Star Vijay
 Kana Kaanum Kaalangal (2006–2013), Star Vijay, Star Vijay Super
 Kana Kaanum Kaalangal (2022–present), Disney+ Hotstar
 Kartika (2004), Hungama TV
 Kota Factory (2019–present), The Viral Fever
 Kyun Hota Hai Pyarrr (2002–2004), Star Plus
 Laakhon Mein Ek (2017–2019), Amazon Prime Video
 Mastaangi (2016), Channel V India
 Miley Jab Hum Tum (2008–2010), STAR One
 Million Dollar Girl (2014–2015), Channel V India
 Mismatched (2020–present), Netflix
 MTV Fanaah (2014–2015), MTV India
 MTV Webbed (2013–2014), MTV India
 Neev (1990), DD National
 Nisha Aur Uske Cousins (2014–2015), Star Plus
 O Gujariya: Badlein Chal Duniya (2014), Channel V India
 P.S. I Hate You (2014), Channel V India
 Paanch 5 Wrongs Make A Right (2013–2014), Channel V India
 Princess Dollie Aur Uska Magic Bag (2004–2005), STAR One
 Puncch Beat (2019), ALTBalaji
 Pyaar Kii Ye Ek Kahaani (2010–2011), STAR One
 Pyaar Tune Kya Kiya (2014–2017), Zing
 Pyaar Vyaar and All That (2005), MTV India
 REJCTX (2019–2020), ZEE5
 Remix (2004–2006), STAR One
 Sabki Laadli Bebo (2009–2011), Star Plus
 Sadda Haq (2013–2016), Channel V India
 School Days (1997–1999), DD National
 Secret Diaries: The Hidden Chapters (2014–2015), Channel V India
 Selection Day (2018–2019), Netflix
 Suvreen Guggal – Topper of The Year (2012–2013), Channel V India
 Swim Team (2015–2016), Channel V India
 Twist Wala Love (2015), Channel V India
 Warrior High (2015), MTV India
 Yahan Ke Hum Sikandar (2011–2013), DD National
 Yeh Hai Aashiqui (2013–2016), Bindass
 Yeh Jawani Ta Ra Ri Ri (2014), Channel V India
 Ye Meri Life Hai (2004–2005), SET
 Yeh Un Dinon Ki Baat Hai (2017–2019), SET
 Zindagi Wins (2015), Bindass

Indonesia 
 Bastian Steel Bukan Cowok Biasa (2014), RCTI
  (2006), SCTV
  (2022–present), Disney+ Hotstar
  (2023–present), SCTV 
  (1996), RCTI
 Pretty Little Liars (2020), Viu
  (2022–present), Disney+ Hotstar

Ireland 
 Aifric (2006–2007), TG4
 Eipic (2016), TG4
 The Spike (1978), RTÉ

Israel 
 Alumim (2021–present), Kan 11
  (2020–present), Channel 13
 Deus (2008–2010), Arutz HaYeladim
  (2018), HOT
 Euphoria (2012–2013), HOT3
  (2016–2017), Arutz HaYeladim, HOT
  (2018–2019), TeenNick Israel
 Galis (2012–2016), Arutz HaYeladim, HOT
 The Greenhouse (2012–2016), TeenNick Israel
 Ha-Yeladim Mi'Givat Napoleon (2001–2004), Arutz HaYeladim
 HaShminiya (2005–2014), Arutz HaYeladim
  (2014–2018), TeenNick Israel 
 Inyan Shel Zman (1992–1996), Israeli Educational Television
 North Star (2014–2016), Disney Channel Israel
  (2020–present), TeenNick Israel
  (2017–2019), Nickelodeon Israel
 Split (2009–2012), HOT, Arutz HaYeladim
  (2012–2013), Disney Channel Israel
  (2016–2021), TeenNick Israel

Italy 

 Anna (2021), Sky Italia
 A.U.S. - Adotta Uno Studente (2015), Rai.tv
 Baby (2018–2020), Netflix
 Bang Bang Baby (2022–present), Amazon Prime Video
  (2022–present), Sky Atlantic
 Braccialetti rossi (2014–2016), Rai 1
 Club 57 (2019–2020), Rai Gulp
  (2015), Rai 4
  (2015), Rai 4
 Compagni di scuola (2001), Rai 2
  (2019–2021), Rai 1
 Corpo Libero (2022–present), Rai 2, Paramount+
 Curon (2020), Netflix
  (2022−present), Netflix
 Fate: The Winx Saga (2021–2022), Netflix
 Fuoriclasse (2011–2015), Rai 1
  (2015), Rai.tv
 Genitori vs figli (2015), Rai.tv
 Interbang‽ (1984), Odeon TV
 I liceali (2008–2011), Joi, Canale 5
  (2019–2020), Rai Gulp
 The Lying Life of Adults (2023), Netflix
 Lontana da me (2015), Rai.tv
 Love Dilemma (2018), Real Time
 Luna Nera (2020), Netflix
 Mare fuori (2020–present), Rai 2
  (2020), RaiPlay
 My Brilliant Friend (2018–present), HBO, Rai 1, TIMvision
  (2011), Rai 1
  (2021), RaiPlay
 Penny on M.A.R.S. (2018–2020), Disney Channel Italy
 Prisma (2022–present), Amazon Prime Video
  (2021–present), Rai Gulp
  (2018), Rai 1
  (2018–present), TIMvision, Netflix
 Summertime (2020–2022), Netflix
 Zero (2021), Netflix

Japan 

 1 Litre no Namida (2005), Fuji TV
 14-sai no Haha (2006), NTV
  (1994), Fuji TV
  (2020), AbemaTV
  (2019), NTV
 35-sai no Koukousei (2013), NTV
  (2013), NTV
  (1987–1988), Fuji TV
 Aikatsu Planet! (2021), TXN
 Amachan (2013), NHK
  (2018), TBS
 Asunaro Hakusho (1993), Fuji TV
  (2022) NTV
  (2021), AbemaTV
  (2019), NTV, Hulu
 Blazing Transfer Students (2017), Netflix
 Boku no Ikiru Michi (2003), Fuji TV
 Boys Over Flowers Season 2 (2018), TBS
  (2018), NTV
  (2006), Fuji TV
 Chūgakusei Nikki (2018), TBS
  (2022), NTV
  (2022), Fuji TV, Tokai TV
 Crow's Blood (2016), Hulu
  (2006), Fuji TV
  (2016), TBS
 A Devil and Her Love Song (2021), Hulu
 Detective School Q (2007), NTV
  (2019), FBS, Hulu
 Dive!! (2021), TV Tokyo
 Dragon Zakura (2005), Tokyo Broadcasting System|TBS
  (2005), NHK
 Flower and the Beast (2017–2019), dTV, Fuji TV
 Flunk Punk Rumble (2010), TBS
  (2000), NHK
  (2022), TV Asahi
  (2022), MBS
 Fujoshi, Ukkari Gei ni Kokuru (2019), NHK
 Gakkō ja Oshierarenai! (2008), NTV
 Gakkō no Kaidan (2015), NTV
 GaruGaku ~Girls Garden~ (2021), TV Tokyo
  (1996), NTV
 Given (2021), Fuji TV
 Gomen ne Seishun! (2014), TBS
  (2022), Kansai TV, Tokyo MX
  (2019), TBS
 Hana Yori Dango (2005), TBS
 Hana Yori Dango Returns (2007), TBS
 Hanazakari no Kimitachi e (2007), Fuji TV
 Hanazakari no Kimitachi e (2011), Fuji TV
  (2015), NTV
 Hatsumori Bemars (2015), TV Tokyo
  (1987), Fuji TV
 Here Is Greenwood (2008), TV Tokyo
  (2012), BeeTV
  (2021), TV Asahi
  (1989), TBS
  (2021), Fuji TV
  (2019), Nagoya TV
 Hiyokko (2017), NHK
 Honey and Clover (2008), Fuji TV
  (1969), NTV
 I"s (2018–2019), SKY PerfecTV!
 Itazura na Kiss (1996), TV Asahi
  (2022–present), Fuji TV
 Kaguya-sama: Love Is War (2021), TBS, Amazon Prime Video
 Kakegurui – Compulsive Gambler (2018–2019), MBS
 Kinpachi-sensei (1979–2011), TBS
 Koeharu! (2021), NTV
 Koi ni Mudaguchi (2022), ABC
  (2019–2022), NTV
 Koizora (2008), TBS
  (2021), WOWOW Prime
 Kōkōsei Restaurant (2011), NTV
 Komi Can't Communicate (2021), NHK
  (2021), TBS
  (1966), NTV
  (2020), NHK
  (1993), TBS
  (2003), TBS
 Kyō Kara Ore Wa!! (2018), NTV
  (2022), MBS
  (1999), TBS
 Life (2007), Fuji TV
 Limit (2013), TV Tokyo
 The Long Love Letter (2002), Fuji TV
 MAGI The Tensho Boys' Embassy (2019), Amazon Prime Video
  (2021), Hulu
  (2017), MBS
 Majimuri Gakuen (2018), NTV
 Majisuka Gakuen (2010–2011), TV Tokyo
  (2020), TV Asahi
  (1984), Fuji TV
 Mei-chan no Shitsuji (2009), Fuji TV
  (2022), TV Asahi
 Moyasimon: Tales of Agriculture (2012), Fuji TV
 Mujaki na Kankei (1984), TBS
 Murai no Koi (2022), TBS
 My Boss My Hero (2006), NTV
 My Love Mix-Up! (2021), TV Asahi
  (2022), Fuji TV
  (1985–1986), TBS
 Nobuta wo Produce (2005), NTV
 Nodame Cantabile (2006), Fuji TV
  (2015), TBS
 Orange Days (2004), TBS
 Otomen (2009), Fuji TV
 Our Textbook (2007), Fuji TV
 Perfect Son (2012), NTV
 Piece – Kanojo no Kioku (2012), NTV
 Ponytail wa Furimukanai (1985–1986), TBS
 Princess Princess D (2006), TV Asahi
 Prison School (2015), MBS, TBS
  (1987–1988), Fuji TV
  (2007), TV Asahi
  (2010), NTV
 Re:Mind (2017), Netflix, TV Tokyo
  (2001), TV Tokyo
 Rokudenashi Blues (2011), NTV
 Rookies (2008), TBS
 Sailor Suit and Machine Gun (1982), Fuji TV
 Sailor Suit and Machine Gun (2006), TBS
  (2014), TV Tokyo
 Saki (2016), TBS
 Samurai High School (2009), NTV
  (2022), TBS
 Scrap Teacher (2008), NTV
 School Wars: Hero (1984–1985), TBS
 Scum's Wish (2017), Fuji TV
 Seven Days of a Daddy and a Daughter (2007), TBS
  (2022), TBS
  (1994), TV Asahi
  (2015), Fuji TV
  (2021), TSK
  (2022), NHK
 Shin Shinchou Kouki: Classmate wa Sengoku Busho (2022–present), NTV
 Shiritsu Bakaleya Koukou (2012), NTV
 Shōkōjo Seira (2009), TBS
 Short Program (2022), Amazon Prime Video
  (2016), TV Asahi
  (2020), Fuji TV
  (2022), WOWOW
 Sono toki Heartwa Nusumareta (1992), Fuji TV
  (2010), Fuji TV
  (2018), NTV
 Sprout (2012), NTV
 Stand Up! (2003), TBS
 Strawberry on the Shortcake (2001), TBS
  (2021), YouTube
 Sūgaku Joshi Gakuen (2012), NTV
 Sugarless (2012), NTV
 Sukeban Deka (1985), TV Asahi
 Sumire 16 sai!! (2008), BS Fuji
 Sumo Do, Sumo Don't (2022–present), Disney+
 Switched (2018), Netflix
 Taiyo to Umi no Kyoshitsu (2008), Fuji TV
  (2022), MBS
 Teen Court: 10-dai Saiban (2012), NTV
  (1999), TV Asahi
  (2022–present), Fuji TV
 Terms for a Witch (1999), TBS
 Threads of Destiny (2008–2009), Fuji TV
  (2016), TV Tokyo
 Tomehane! Suzuri Kōkō Shodōbu (2010), NHK
 Transit Girls (2015), Fuji TV
  (1987), TV Asahi
  (2010), TBS
  (2021), MBS
  (1996), TBS
 Water Boys (2004), Fuji TV
 Water Boys 2 (2004), Fuji TV
 Water Boys 2005 Natsu (2005), Fuji TV
 Water Polo Yankees (2014), Fuji TV
 XxxHolic (2013), WOWOW
  (1974), NTV
 Yamada-kun and the Seven Witches (2013), Fuji TV
 Yamato Nadeshiko Shichi Henge (2010), TBS
  (2008), Family Gekijo
 Yowakutemo Katemasu (2014), NTV
 Yowamushi Pedal (2016–2018), SKY PerfecTV!
  (1994), TBS
  (2019), NTV
  (2017), NTV
  (2022), ABC

Jordan 
 AlRawabi School for Girls (2021–present), Netflix
 Jinn (2019), Netflix

Kenya 
 PAA, Born to FLY (2022–present), Citizen TV
 Shuga (2009–2011), MTV Base
 Tahidi High (2006–present), Citizen TV

Mexico 

 11-11: En mi cuadra nada cuadra (2013), Nickelodeon Latin America
 Agujetas de color de rosa (1994–1995), Canal de las Estrellas
 Alcanzar una estrella (1990), Canal de las Estrellas
 Alcanzar una estrella II (1991), Canal de las Estrellas
 Amigas y rivales (2001), Canal de las Estrellas
 Aventuras en el tiempo (2001), Canal de las Estrellas
 Baila conmigo (1992), Canal de las Estrellas
  (2011), Cadenatres
 Buscando el paraíso (1993–1994), Canal de las Estrellas
 Clap, el lugar de tus sueños (2003–2004), Canal de las Estrellas
 Clase 406 (2002–2003), Canal de las Estrellas
 The Club (2019), Netflix
 Código postal (2006–2007), Televisa
 Cómplices al rescate (2002), Canal de las Estrellas
 Confidente de secundaria (1996), Canal de las Estrellas
 Control Z (2020–2022), Netflix
 El corazón nunca se equivoca (2019), Las Estrellas
 Corazones al límite (2004), Televisa
 Daddies on Request (2022–present), Disney+
 Dani Who? (2019–2020), Paramount Channel
 Despertar contigo (2016–2017), Canal de las Estrellas
 Diablo Guardián (2018–2019), Amazon Prime Video
 Divina, está en tu corazón (2017), Canal 5
 DKDA: Sueños de juventud (1999–2000), Canal de las Estrellas
 Dulce desafío (1988–1989), Televisa S.A. de C.V.
  (2003), Azteca Trece
 Gossip Girl: Acapulco (2013), Golden Premier, UniMás, Canal 5
 El juego de la vida (2001–2002), Canal de las Estrellas
 Kally's Mashup (2017–2019), Nickelodeon Latin America
 Like (2018–2019), Las Estrellas
 Locura de amor (2000), Canal de las Estrellas
 Lola: Once Upon a Time (2007–2008), Televisa
 Luz y sombra (1989), Canal de las Estrellas
 Mágica juventud (1992–1993), Canal de las Estrellas
 Mi pequeña traviesa (1997–1998), Canal de las Estrellas
 The Most Beautiful Flower (2022–present), Netflix
 Muchachitas (1991–1992), Televisa
 Muchachitas como tú (2007), Televisa
 Niña de mi corazón (2010), Canal de las Estrellas
  (2010–2013), MTV Latin America
 Pobre juventud (1986–1987), Canal de las Estrellas
 Preciosa (1998), Canal de las Estrellas
 Primer amor... a mil por hora (2000–2001), Televisa
 ¿Qué le pasa a mi familia? (2021), Canal de las Estrellas
 Quinceañera (1987–1988), Televisa S.A. de C.V.
 Rebelde (2004–2006), TL Novelas
 Rebelde (2022–present), Netflix
 La reina soy yo (2019), Univision, Canal de las Estrellas
 Soltero con hijas (2019–2020), Canal de las Estrellas
 Soñadoras (1998–1999), Televisa
 Soy Luna (2016–2018), Disney Channel Latin America
 Súbete a mi moto (2020), Amazon Prime Video
  (2012), MTV Latin America
 Vencer el desamor (2020–2021), Canal de las Estrellas
 Vencer el miedo (2020), Canal de las Estrellas
 Vencer el pasado (2021), Canal de las Estrellas
 Vencer la ausencia (2022), Canal de las Estrellas
 Verano de amor (2009), Televisa

Netherlands 
 Ares (2020), Netflix
  (2016–2019), Nickelodeon Netherlands
 The First Years (2014–present), NPO 3
 Goede tijden, slechte tijden (1990–present), RTL 4
 Herres (2021–present), NPO 3
 Het Huis Anubis (2006–2009), Nickelodeon Netherlands
 Het Huis Anubis en de Vijf van het Magische Zwaard (2010–2011), Nickelodeon Netherlands
 The Letter for the King (2020), Netflix
 Locked Out (2020–present), NPO 3
 Misfit: The Series (2021–present), Netflix
  (2016–2018), RTL 4, RTL 5
  (2017–present), NPO 3
  (2018–2019), NPO 3
 SpangaS  (2007–2022), Nederland 3, NPO 3
 Topstars (2004–2006), TROS
  (2009–2014) EO
  (2010–2013), Nederland 3
 Wadoeje (2022–present), NPO 3
 WTF?! (2022–present), NPO 3
 Zoop (2004–2007), Nickelodeon Netherlands

New Zealand 
 The Cul de Sac (2016–2018), TV2
 Head High (2020–2021), Three
 The Killian Curse (2006–2008), TV2
 Maddigan's Quest (2006), TV3
 Mystic (2020–present), TVNZ
 The New Legends of Monkey (2018–2020), TV2
 Paradise Café (2009–2011), TV2, CBBC
 This Is Piki (2016), Māori Television

Nigeria 
 Best Friends in the World (2018–present), YouTube
 Far from Home (2022–present), Netflix
 Shuga (2013–2020), MTV Base

Norway 
  (2018), NRK3
  (2018–2019), NRK3
  (2001), NRK1
  (1987), NRK
 Heirs of the Night (2019–2020), NRK3
  (2013–2017), NRK Super
  (2004–2006), NRK1
  (2022), TV2
  (2020–present), NRK Super
  (2019–2020), NRK3
 Lik Meg (2018–present), NRK Super
  (2018–2019), NRK3
  (2010–2012), NRK Super
 Nødt eller sannhet (2021), NRK Super
 Nudes (2019), NRK3
 Ragnarok (2020–present), Netflix
  (2018–2019), null.video, NRK1
 Skam (2015–2017), NRK3
 Skitten snø (2019), NRK3
  (2014–2016), NRK Super
  (2002), NRK1

Pakistan 
 Dreamers (2010–2011), Aag TV
 Humsafar (2011–2012), Hum TV
 Kahi Un Kahi (2012), Hum TV
 Khwab Saraye (2016), Hum TV
 Kiya Life Hai (2011), ARY Digital
 Main Abdul Qadir Hoon (2010–2011), Hum TV
 Mann Mayal (2016), Hum TV
 Meri Behan Maya (2012–2013), Geo TV
 Meri Saheli Meri Humjoli (2012), Urdu 1
 Mor Mahal (2012–2013), Geo TV
 Teri Meri Kahani (2018), Hum TV
 Zindagi Gulzar Hai (2012–2013), Hum TV

Peru
 Boulevard Torbellino (1997), 
  (2018), América Televisión
  (1997), Latina Televisión

Philippines 

 1DOL (2010), ABS-CBN
 Abt Ur Luv (2006–2008), ABS-CBN
 Amo (2018), 5
 Angelito: Batang Ama (2011–2012), ABS-CBN
 Anna Karenina (1996–2002), GMA Network
 Anna Karenina (2013), GMA Network
 Aryana (2012–2013), ABS-CBN
 Astigs (2008), ABS-CBN
 Bagets: Just Got Lucky (2011–2012), TV5
 Bagito (2014–2015), ABS-CBN
 Beach Bros (2022), iWantTFC
 Berks (2002–2004), ABS-CBN
 BFGF (2010–2011), TV5
 Boys' Lockdown (2020), YouTube
 Click (1999–2004), GMA Network
 Doble Kara (2015–2017), ABS-CBN
 Dormitoryo (2013), GMA Network
 First Time (2010), GMA Network
 Gameboys (2020), YouTube
 G-mik (1999–2002), ABS-CBN
 Gimik (1996–1999), ABS-CBN
 Good Vibes (2011), ABS-CBN
 Got to Believe (2013–2014), ABS-CBN
 Growing Up (1997–1999), GMA Network
 Growing Up (2011–2012), ABS-CBN
 The Half Sisters (2014–2016), GMA Network
 He's Into Her (2021–2022), iWantTFC, Kapamilya Channel, A2Z
 Huwag Kang Mangamba (2021), A2Z, Kapamilya Channel, TV5
 Ina, Kapatid, Anak (2012–2013), ABS-CBN
 Joyride (2004–2005), GMA Network
 Kahit Kailan (2002–2003), GMA Network
 Katorse (2009–2010), ABS-CBN
 Lipgloss (2008–2009), TV5
 Mara Clara (1992–1997), ABS-CBN
 Mara Clara (2010–2011), ABS-CBN
 My Girl (2008), ABS-CBN
 Oh My G! (2015), ABS-CBN
 On the Wings of Love (2015–2016), ABS-CBN
 Princess and I (2012–2013), ABS-CBN
 POSH (2006), Q
 Sana Maulit Muli (2007), ABS-CBN
 Sarah the Teen Princess (2004), ABS-CBN
 Spirits (2004–2005), ABS-CBN
 Spirits: Reawaken (2018), iWant
 T.G.I.S. (1995–1999), GMA Network
 Tabing Ilog (1999–2003), ABS-CBN
 Teen Gen (2012–2013), GMA Network
 That's My Amboy (2016), GMA Network
 Till I Met You (2016–2017), ABS-CBN
 Together Forever (2012), GMA Network
 Trops (2016–2017), GMA Network
 Tween Hearts (2010–2012), GMA Network
 Wish I May (2016), GMA Network

Poland 
 Open Your Eyes (2021–present), Netflix
 Sexify (2021–present), Netflix

Portugal
 Água de Mar (2014–2015), RTP1
  (2013–2017), TVI
 Lua Vermelha (2010–2012), SIC
  (2016), TVI
 Morangos com Açúcar (2003–2012), TVI
  (1990–1992), RTP1
 Rebelde Way (2008–2009), SIC
  (1997), RTP1

Puerto Rico
 @Gina Yei: #WithAllMyHeartAndMore (2023–present), Disney+
 Súbete a mi moto (2020), Amazon Prime Video

Singapore
 On the Fringe (1988), Channel 8
 On the Fringe (2011), Channel 8
 Spin (1999), Channel 5
 Teenage Textbook – The Series (2021–present), Channel 5
 Vetri (2014–2016), Vasantham

South Africa
 Backstage (2000–2007), e.tv
 Blood & Water (2020–present), Netflix
 The Girl from St. Agnes, (2019), Showmax
 Grassroots (2019), One Magic, Showmax
 Is'Thunzi (2016–2017), Mzansi Magic
 Jiva! (2021–present), Netflix
 Nkululeko (2018–2019), Mzansi Magic
 Shuga (2017–2020), MTV Base
 Signal High (2013–2018), SABC 2
 Skeem Saam (2011–present, SABC 1
 Yizo Yizo (1999–2004), SABC 1

South Korea 

  (2015), Naver TV Cast
 A-Teen (2018), Naver TV Cast
 A-Teen 2 (2019), Naver TV Cast
 Adult Trainee (2021), TVING
  (2013–2015), MBC Every 1, Naver TV Cast
  (2014), Naver TV Cast
 All of Us Are Dead (2022–present), Netflix
 Andante (2017–2018), KBS1
 Angry Mom (2015), MBC
 Arthdal Chronicles (2019–present), tvN
 At a Distance, Spring Is Green (2021), KBS2
 At Eighteen (2019), JTBC
  (2000), MBC
  (2019–2022), V Live
 Big (2012), KBS2
  (1987–1988), MBC
 Boys Over Flowers (2009), KBS2
 Brilliant Legacy (2009), SBS
 Cheer Up! (2015), KBS2
 Cheer Up (2022), SBS
 Cheese in the Trap (2016), tvN
 Cinderella with Four Knights (2016), tvN
 City Hunter (2011), SBS
 Class of Lies (2019), OCN
  (2016), MBC Every 1, Naver TV Cast
 Cool Guys, Hot Ramen (2011), tvN
 Dear. M (2022), KBS2
  (2017–2018), Naver TV Cast
 Doctor Stranger (2014), SBS
 Dream High (2011), KBS2
 Dream High 2 (2012), KBS2
  (2004), MBC
 Extracurricular (2020), Netflix
 Extraordinary You (2019), MBC
 Faith (2012), SBS
  (2022), EBS 1TV
  (2019), SBS
  (2018–2019), Olleh TV
  (2015), Naver TV Cast
 Flower Band (2012), tvN
 Gangnam Beauty (2018), JTBC
 Girls' Generation 1979 (2017), KBS2
 The Golden Spoon (2022–present), MBC
 Gu Family Book (2013), MBC
 Heard It Through the Grapevine (2015), SBS
 Heartstrings (2011), MBC
 The Heirs (2013), SBS
 Hello, Me! (2021), KBS2
 Hi! School: Love On (2014), KBS2
 High School King of Savvy (2014), tvN
 How to Buy a Friend (2020), KBS2
 I Am Sam (2007), KBS2
  (2019–2020), V Live, JTBC
  (2018–2019), Naver TV Cast
 Jungle Fish (2008), KBS2
 Just Dance (2018), KBS2
  (1999–2000), KBS2
 The Liar and His Lover (2017), tvN
 Lie to Me (2011), SBS
 Live On (2020–2021), JTBC
 Love Alarm (2019–2021), Netflix
 Love in the Moonlight (2016), KBS2
 Love Revolution (2020), KakaoTV, Naver TV Cast
 A Love So Beautiful (2020–2021), KakaoTV, 
 Ma Boy (2012), Tooniverse
 Mackerel Run (2007), SBS
 Marry Me, Mary! (2010), KBS2
 Master of Study (2010), KBS2
 Master's Sun (2013), SBS
  (2022–present), Naver Now
 Missing You (2012–2013), MBC
  (2021), EBS 1
 Monstar (2013), Mnet, tvN
 Moorim School: Saga of the Brave (2016), KBS2
 My First First Love (2019), Netflix
 My First Love (2018), OCN
 My Love By My Side (2011), SBS
  (2020), Tooniverse
 My Runway (2016), tvN
 My Strange Hero (2018–2019), SBS
  (2019–2020), Tooniverse
 Naeil's Cantabile (2014), KBS2
 Nevertheless (2021), JTBC
 Operation Proposal (2012), TV Chosun
 Orange Marmalade (2015), KBS2
 Page Turner (2016), KBS2
 Pinocchio (2014), SBS
 Playful Kiss (2010), MBC
 Police University (2021), KBS2
 Princess Hours (2006), MBC
 Puberty Medley (2013), KBS2
 Racket Boys (2021), SBS
  (2011), MBC Every 1
  (2021), KakaoTV
 Reply 1988 (2015–2016), tvN
 Reply 1994 (2013), tvN
 Reply 1997 (2012), tvN
 Reunited Worlds (2017), SBS
 Revenge of Others (2022), Star
 Romance (2002), MBC
 Rookie Cops (2022), Star
 Sang Doo! Let's Go to School (2003), KBS2
 School (1999), KBS2
 School 2 (1999–2000), KBS2
 School 3 (2000–2001), KBS2
 School 4 (2001–2002), KBS2
 School 2013 (2012–2013), KBS2
 School 2017 (2017), KBS2
 School 2021 (2021–2022), KBS2
 Schoolgirl Detectives (2014–2015), JTBC
  (2006), EBS 1
 Secret Garden (2010–2011), SBS
  (2017), Naver TV Cast
 Sharp (2003–2007), KBS2
 SKY Castle (2018–2019), JTBC
 So Not Worth It (2021), Netflix
 Solomon's Perjury (2016), JTBC
  (2017), Naver TV Cast, JTBC
 The Sound of Magic (2022), Netflix
 Sungkyunkwan Scandal (2010), KBS2
 Sweet Home (2020), Netflix
 Sweet Revenge (2017–2018), Oksusu
 Sweet Revenge 2 (2018), XtvN
 To the Beautiful You (2012), SBS
 True Beauty (2020–2021), tvN
 Twenty-Five Twenty-One (2022), tvN
 Two Weeks (2013), MBC
  (2022), 
  (2017), Naver TV Cast
 Weak Hero Class 1 (2022), Wavve
 What Happens to My Family? (2014-2015), KBS2
 Weightlifting Fairy Kim Bok-joo (2016–2017), MBC
 What's Up (2011–2012), MBN
 White Christmas (2017), KBS
 Who Are You: School 2015 (2015), KBS2
  (2020–2022), V Live
 You're All Surrounded (2014), SBS
 You're Beautiful (2009), SBS

Spain 

  (2008–2009), Antena 3
  (2002–2003), Telecinco
 90-60-90, diario secreto de una adolescente (2009), Antena 3
 Al salir de clase (1997–2002), Telecinco
 Alive and Kicking (2021), Movistar+
 Amistades peligrosas (2006), Cuatro
 El barco (2011–2012), Antena 3
 Compañeros (1998–2002), Antena 3
 Cucut (2022), TV3
  (2014), Cuatro
 Élite (2018–present), Netflix
 Feria: The Darkest Light (2022), Netflix
 Física o química (2008–2011), Antena 3
  (2019), Disney Channel Spain
 The Girl in the Mirror (2022–present), Netflix
 HIT (2020), La 1
  (2022), HBO Max
  (2008–2009), Cuatro
 The Hockey Girls (2019–2020), TV3
 El internado (2007–2010), Antena 3
 The Boarding School: Las Cumbres (2021–present), Amazon Prime Video
 Merlí (2015–2018), TV3
 Merlí: Sapere Aude (2019–2021), Movistar+
  (2021), TV3
 Nada es para siempre (1999–2000), Antena 3
 Paradise (2021–present), Movistar+
 Un paso adelante (2002–2005), Antena 3
 La pecera de Eva (2010–2011), Telecinco
 Polseres vermelles (2011–2013), TV3
 Queer You Are (2021), TNT
 Ser o no ser (2022), RTVE Play
 Skam España (2018–2020), Movistar+
 SMS (2006–2007), laSexta
 Verano azul (1981–1982), TVE1
  (1998), La 2
 Welcome to Eden (2022–present), Netflix
  (2015–2018), Divinity
  (2022–present), Netflix

Sweden 
 Beartown (2020), HBO Nordic
 Bert (1994), Kanal 1
 Cryptid (2020), Viaplay
  (2019), SVT Barn
 Eagles (2019–2022), SVT Play
 Eva & Adam (1999–2000), SVT1
 Festen (2019–2021), SVT Play
  (1997), SVT1
 #hashtag (2016), SVT1
  (2005), SVT1
  (2012–2014), SVT Play
 Quicksand (2019), Netflix
  (2020), SVT1, SVT Play
  (2018–2020), SVT1
  (2002–2003), SVT1
  (1990–1991), Kanal 1
 Strula (2021), SVT Play
 Xerxes (1988), Kanal 1
 Young Royals (2021–present), Netflix

Taiwan 

  (2022), 
  (2018), TVBS Entertainment Channel
 Angel 'N' Devil (2014–2015), GTV
  (2013), TTV
  (2013), NTV Variety
  (2013), PTS
 Brown Sugar Macchiato (2007), FTV
 Bull Fighting (2007–2008), TTV
 Bump Off Lover (2006), CTV
  (2018), TTV
  (2019), PTS
 Dangerous Mind (2006), PTS
  (2010), PTS
  (2021), YouTube
 Detention (2020), PTS
 Devil Beside You (2005), CTV
  (2020), myVideo
  (2016), CTV
 Gloomy Salad Days (2010), PTS
 Green Forest, My Home (2005–2006), TTV
 Hanazakarino Kimitachihe (2006–2007), CTS
 Hi My Sweetheart (2009–2010), CTS
  (2017), GTV
 HIStory (2017–2021), CHOCO TV, LINE TV
 Honey and Clover (2008), CTS
 Hot Shot (2008), CTV
 In a Good Way (2013–2014), SET Metro
 It Started with a Kiss (2005–2006), CTV
  (2018), iQIYI
 K.O.3an Guo (2009–2010), FTV
  (2017), iQIYI
 KO One (2005–2006), GTV
 KO One Re-act (2013) GTV
 KO One Re-call (2018), iQIYI
 KO One Re-member (2016), GTV
 KO One Return (2012), GTV
 Lavender (2001–2002), SET Taiwan
 The Legend of Brown Sugar Chivalries (2008), STAR TV
  (2022–2023), iQIYI
  (2004), TVBS-G
 Love Cuisine (2015–2016), SET Metro
  (2010), EBC Yoyo
  (2010–2011), EBC Yoyo
  (2011–2012), EBC Yoyo
  (2012–2013), EBC Yoyo
  (2013), EBC Yoyo
  (2014), EBC Yoyo
 Mars (2004), CTS
 Meteor Garden (2001), CTS
 Meteor Garden II (2002), CTS
 Meteor Rain (1999–2001), CTS
 Miss No Good (2008), CTS
 Momo Love (2009–2010), CTV
  (2015), GTV
 More than Blue: The Series (2021), Netflix
 My MVP Valentine (2002), SET Taiwan
 Mysterious Incredible Terminator (2008–2009), GTV
  (2017), KKTV, iQIYI
  (2008), Hakka TV
 The Rose (2003), TTV
  (2003), TVBS-G
 Skip Beat! (2011–2012), FTV, GTV
 Someday or One Day (2019–2020), CTV
  (2011), Hakka TV
 Spicy Teacher (2000–2004), CTS
 The Teen Age (2007), CTS
 The Teenage Psychic (2017), PTS
  (2019), PTS
 ToGetHer (2009), CTV
 Tomorrow (2002), CTV
 We Best Love (2021), WeTV
 Year of the Rain (2010), PTS
 Ying Ye 3 Jia 1 (2007), TTV
  (2021–2022), TVBS Entertainment Channel

Thailand 

 2Moons: The Series (2017–2022), One31
 2gether: The Series (2020), GMM 25, LINE TV, Netflix
 55:15 Never Too Late (2021–2022), Disney+ Hotstar
 Blacklist (2019), GMM 25, LINE TV
 'Cause You're My Boy (2018), GMMTV
  (2020–2021), PPTV, iQIYI
  (2022), GMM 25
 The Gifted (2018), One31, LINE TV
 The Gifted: Graduation (2020), GMM 25, LINE TV
 Girl From Nowhere (2018), GMM 25
 Gossip Girl: Thailand (2015), Channel 3
 Great Men Academy (2019), LINE TV
 He's Coming to Me (2019), LINE TV
 Hormones: The Series (2013–2015), One31, GMM 25, GTH On Air
 I Told Sunset About You (2020–2021), LINE TV
 The Judgement (2018), GMM 25
 Kiss: The Series (2016), GMM 25
 Kiss Me (2015), True4U
 LOL: The Series (2015), True4U
 Love Sick: The Series (2014–2015), Modernine TV
 Make It Right (2016–2017), Channel 9 MCOT HD, LINE TV
 My Bromance: The Series (2016–2017), Channel 9 MCOT HD
 My Dream The Series (2018), LINE TV
  (2022–present), GMM 25
  (2006), Channel 3
  (2016), GMM 25, Netflix
 Our Skyy (2018), LINE TV
  (2015), Channel 9 MCOT HD
  (2016), Channel 9 MCOT HD
  (2016), PPTV
  (2017), True4U
 Project S: The Series (2017–2018), GMM 25
 Room Alone 401-410 (2014), One31, Bang Channel
 Room Alone 2 (2015–2016), One31, Bang Channel
 School Tales The Series (2022–present), Netflix
  (2022), Channel 3
 Secret Seven (2017), One31
 Senior Secret Love (2016), One31
 The Shipper (2020), GMM 25, LINE TV
 Slam Dance (2017), One31
 Social Death Vote (2018), Channel 3
  (2022), GMM 25
 Still 2gether (2020), GMM 25, LINE TV
 The Stranded (2019), Netflix
 SOTUS: The Series (2016–2017), One31
 SOTUS S: The Series (2017–2018), One31
 Teenage Mom: The Series (2017), LINE TV, One31
 ThirTEEN Terrors (2014–2015), One31, GTH On Air
 Theory of Love (2019), GMM 25, LINE TV
 Turn Left Turn Right (2020), GMM 25, LINE TV
 U-Prince Series (2016–2017), GMM 25
 Ugly Duckling (2015), GMM 25
  (2019), Channel 3
  (2016), Channel 9 MCOT HD
 Water Boyy: The Series (2017), GMM 25
 Who Are You (2020), GMM 25, LINE TV
 Wonder Teacher (2015), One31
 YOUniverse (2018), LINE TV

Turkey 
 Adını Feriha Koydum (2011–2012), Show TV
 Arka Sıradakiler (2007–2011), Fox Turkey
  (2013–2014), Kanal D
 Hepsi 1 (2007–2008), ATV
 Little Secrets (2010–2011), Kanal D, Star TV
 Love 101 (2020–2021), Netflix
 Kavak Yelleri (2007–2011), Kanal D
 Kiraz Mevsimi (2014–2015), Fox Turkey
 Medcezir (2013–2015), Star TV
  (2009–2010), Show TV
  (2011–2013), Show TV
 The Protector (2018–2020), Netflix
  (2013–2014), Fox Turkey
 Sudan Bıkmış Balıklar (2012), Star TV

Ukraine
 Early Swallows (2019–2020), Novyi Kanal
  (2019), Novyi Kanal
  (2020), 1+1
  (2018–2019), 1+1

United Kingdom 

 24Seven (2001–2002), CITV
 4 O'Clock Club (2012–2020), CBBC
 Ackley Bridge (2017–2022), Channel 4
 The A List, (2018–present), BBC iPlayer, Netflix
 After Hours (2015), Sky One
 Alex Rider (2020–present), Amazon Prime Video, IMDb TV
 Almost Never (2019–present), CBBC
 As If (2001–2004), Channel 4
 The Athena (2019), Sky One
 Banana (2015), E4
 The Bastard Son & The Devil Himself (2022), Netflix
 Beautiful People (2008–2009), BBC Two
 Beaver Falls (2011–2012), E4
 Becoming Elizabeth (2022), Starzplay
 Becoming Human (2011), BBC Three
 Being Victor (2010), STV
 The Biz (1994–1996), BBC One
 Bootleg (2002), BBC One
 Born to Kill (2017), Channel 4
 Britannia High (2008), ITV
 Buddy (1986), BBC
 Butterfly (2018), ITV
 Byker Grove (1989–2006), BBC One
 Century Falls (1993), BBC One
 Children of the Stones (1977), ITV
 Children's Ward (1989–2000), ITV
 Chris Cross (1994–1995), CITV
 Class (2016), BBC Three
 Clique (2017–2018), BBC Three
 Codename Icarus (1981), BBC One
 Custer's Last Stand-up (2001–2002), BBC One, RTÉ
 The Cut (2009–2010), BBC Two
 Damon and Debbie (1987), Channel 4
 Dark Season (1991), BBC One
 Demons (2009), ITV
 Desperados (2007), CBBC
 Dodger (2022–present), CBBC
 The Dumping Ground (2013–present), CBBC
 Dubplate Drama (2005–2009), Channel 4
 Earthfasts (1994), BBC One
 EastEnders: E20 (2010–2011), BBC Online
 Elidor (1995), BBC One
 The End of the F***ing World (2017–2019), Channel 4
 The Evermoor Chronicles (2014–2017), Disney Channel UK and Ireland
 The Fades (2011), BBC Three
 Fate: The Winx Saga (2021–present), Netflix
 Follyfoot (1971–1973), ITV
 Free Rein (2017–2019), Netflix
 Gap Year (2017), E4
 Get Even (2020), BBC iPlayer
 Girls in Love (2003–2005), CITV
 Glue (2014), E4
 Grange Hill (1978–2008), BBC One
 The Growing Pains of Adrian Mole (1987), ITV
 The Haunting of Cassie Palmer (1982), ITV
 Heartstopper (2022–present), Netflix
 Hetty Feather (2015–2020), CBBC
 Hex (2004–2005), Sky 1
 His Dark Materials (2019–present), BBC, HBO
 House of Anubis (2011–2013), Nickelodeon, TeenNick
 In the Flesh (2013–2014), BBC Three
 In My Skin (2018–2021), BBC Three
 The Innocents (2018), Netflix
 The Irregulars (2021), Netflix
 It's a Sin (2021), Channel 4
 Jamie Johnson (2016–present), CBBC
 Joe All Alone (2018), CBBC
 Johnny Jarvis (1983), BBC One
 Kappatoo (1990), CITV
 Killer Net (1998), Channel 4
 King Cinder (1977), BBC One
 Kiss Me First (2018), Channel 4
 Ladhood (2019–present), BBC iPlayer
 The Last Bus (2022–present), Netflix
 Leonardo (2011–2012), CBBC
 Life as I Know It (2010), Channel M
 Lockwood & Co. (2023–present), Netflix
 The Lodge (2016–2017), Disney Channel UK and Ireland
 Logan High (2018), BBC iPlayer
 Maggie (1981–1982), BBC Two
 Malory Towers (2020–present), CBBC
 Marie Antoinette (2022–present), BBC Two
 Merlin (2008–2012), BBC One
 M.I. High (2011–2014), CBBC
 Misfits (2009–2013), E4
 Moondial (1988), BBC One
 Mud (1994–1995), CBBC
 My Left Nut (2020), BBC Three
 My Mad Fat Diary (2013–2015), E4
 Mystic (2020–present), CBBC
 Nearly Famous (2007), E4
 Normal People (2020), BBC Three, Hulu
 Noughts + Crosses (2020–present), BBC One
 One Summer (1983), Channel 4
 Overshadowed (2017), BBC Three
 The Owl Service (1969–1970), ITV
 Paradise Café (2009–2011), CBBC
 Postcode (2011), CBBC
 PREMature (2015), Community Channel
 Press Gang (1989–1993), ITV
 Rebel Cheer Squad (2022–present), BBC iPlayer
 Red Rose (2022–present), BBC Three
 The Rising (2022–present), Sky Max
 Roman Mysteries (2007–2008), CBBC
 Rownd a Rownd (1995–present), S4C
 Runaway Bay (1992–1993), ITV
 Scully (1984), Channel 4
 Seacht (2008–2011), BBC Two, TG4
 The Secret Diary Of Adrian Mole, Aged 13¾ (1985), ITV
 Sex Education (2019–present), Netflix
 Shameless (2004–2011), Channel 4
 Silverpoint (2022–present), CBBC
 Skins (2007–2013), E4
 Sky (1975), ITV
 The Sparticle Mystery (2011–2015), CBBC
 Spirit Warriors (2010), BBC Two
 The Story of Tracy Beaker (2002–2006), CBBC
 Sugar Rush (2005–2006), Channel 4
 A Suitable Boy (2020), BBC One
 Summerhill (2008), CBBC, BBC Four
 Tell Me Everything (2022–present), ITVX
 The Tomorrow People (1973–1979), ITV
 The Tomorrow People (1992–1995), ITV
 Top Boy: Summerhouse (2011–2013), Channel 4
 Tracy Beaker Returns (2010–2012), CBBC
 The Tribe (1999–2003), Channel 5
 Trinity (2009), ITV2
 Tucker's Luck (1983–1985), BBC Two
 Two Weeks to Live (2020), Sky One
 Victoria (2016–2019), ITV
 Waterloo Road (2006–2015, 2022–present), BBC One
 The Well (2009), BBC Two
 West 10 LDN (2008), BBC Three
 Wizards vs Aliens (2012–2014), CBBC
 Wolfblood (2012–2017), CBBC
 World's End (2015), CBBC
 Young Dracula (2006–2008; 2011–2014), CBBC
 Youngers (2013–2014), E4
 Zero Chill (2021), Netflix

United States 

 The 100 (2014–2020), The CW
 13 Reasons Why (2017–2020), Netflix
 21 Jump Street (1987–1991), Fox
 90210 (2008–2013), The CW
 Aaron Stone (2009–2010), Disney XD
 ABC Afterschool Special (1972–1997), ABC
 All American (2018–present), The CW
 All American: Homecoming (2022–present), The CW
 American Dreams (2002–2005), NBC
 American Horror Story: 1984 (2019), FX
 American Horror Story: Coven (2013–2014), FX
 Andi Mack (2017–2019), Disney Channel
 Animorphs (1998–2000), Nickelodeon
 Are You Afraid of the Dark? (2019–2021), Nickelodeon
 As If (2002), UPN
 Attaway General (2020–present), Brat
 Atypical (2017–2021), Netflix
 Awkward (2011–2016), MTV
 The Baby-Sitters Club (1990), HBO
 The Baby-Sitters Club (2020–2021), Netflix
 The Beautiful Life (2009), The CW
 Beautiful People (2005–2006), ABC Family
 Becoming Elizabeth (2022), Starz
 The Bedford Diaries (2006), The WB
 Bel-Air (2022–present), Peacock
 Betty (2020–2021), HBO
 The Best Times (1985), NBC
 Beverly Hills, 90210 (1990–2000), Fox
 Beyond the Break (2006–2009), The N
 Big Shot (2021–2022), Disney+
 The Birch (2019–present), Facebook Watch
 Bone Chillers (1996), ABC
 Breaker High (1997–1998), UPN
 Buffy the Vampire Slayer (1997–2003), The WB, UPN
 Bunheads (2012–2013), ABC Family
 Caitlin's Way (2000–2002), Nickelodeon
 California Fever (1979), CBS
 The Carrie Diaries (2013–2014), The CW
 CBS Schoolbreak Special (1980–1996), CBS
 Chambers (2019), Netflix
Charmers (2021–present), Brat
 Chicken Girls (2017–present), Brat
 Chilling Adventures of Sabrina (2018–2020), Netflix
 Chucky (2021–present), Syfy, USA Network
 Cobra Kai (2018–present), YouTube Red, YouTube Premium, Netflix
 Colin in Black & White (2021), Netflix
 Cloak & Dagger (2018–2019), Freeform
 Club 57 (2019–2020), Nickelodeon Latin America
 Clubhouse (2004–2005), CBS
 Crown Lake (2019–2022), Brat
 Cruel Summer (2021–present), Freeform
 Cursed (2020), Netflix
 Dare Me (2019–2020), USA Network
 Dash & Lily (2020), Netflix
 David Makes Man (2019–2021), OWN
 Dawson's Creek (1998–2003), The WB
 Daybreak (2019), Netflix
 Deadly Class (2019), Syfy
 Dead of Summer (2016), Freeform
 Dear White People (2017–2021), Netflix
 Dickinson (2019–2021), Apple TV+
 Dirt (2018–2019), Brat
 Don't Look Deeper (2020), Quibi
 Doogie Howser, M.D. (1989–1993), ABC
 Doogie Kameāloha, M.D. (2021–present), Disney+
 Dwight in Shining Armor (2019–2021), BYU TV
 East Los High (2013–2017), Hulu
 Emerald Cove (1993–1995), Disney Channel
 Euphoria (2019–present), HBO
 Everwood (2002–2006), The WB
 Everything Sucks! (2018), Netflix
 Everything's Gonna Be Okay (2020–2021), Freeform
 Fame (1982–1987), NBC, syndication
 Famous in Love (2017–2018), Freeform
 The Famous Jett Jackson (1998–2001), Disney Channel
 Fate: The Winx Saga (2021–present), Netflix
 The Fear Street Trilogy (2021), Netflix
 Felicity (1998–2002), The WB
 Finding Carter (2014–2015), MTV
 First Kill (2022), Netflix
 Five @ 305 (2018), Primo TV
 Five Points (2018–2019), Facebook Watch
 Flight 29 Down (2005–2007), Discovery Kids
 The Fosters (2013–2018), ABC Family, Freeform
 Foursome (2016–2018), YouTube Red, YouTube Premium
 Freakish (2016–2017), Hulu
 Freaks and Geeks (1999–2000), NBC
 Freeridge (2023–present), Netflix
 Freshman Dorm (1992), CBS
 Friday Night Lights (2006–2011), NBC
 Generation (2021), HBO Max
 The Get Down (2016–2017), Netflix
 Get Real (1999–2000), Fox
 Ghostwriter (1992–1995), PBS
 Ghostwriter (2019–present), Apple TV+
 The Gifted (2017–2019), Fox
 Gigantic (2010–2011), TeenNick
 Gilmore Girls (2000–2007), The WB, The CW
 Ginny & Georgia (2021–present), Netflix
 The Girl in the Woods (2021–present), Peacock
 A Girl Named Jo (2018–2019), Brat
 Glee (2009–2015), Fox
 Glory Daze (2010–2011), TBS
 Gotham Knights (2023–present), The CW
 Gossip Girl (2007–2012), The CW
 Gossip Girl (2021–2023), HBO Max
 Grand Army (2020), Netflix
 Greek (2007–2011), ABC Family
 Greenhouse Academy (2017–2020), Netflix
 Guidance (2015), go90
 Guilt (2016), Freeform
 Hanna (2019–2021), Amazon Prime Video
 Heathers (2018), Paramount Network
 Hellcats (2011–2012), The CW
 Hidden Palms (2007), The CW
 High School (2022–present), Amazon Freevee
 High School Musical: The Musical: The Series (2019–present), Disney+
 His Dark Materials (2019–present), HBO
 Holly Hobbie (2018–present), Hulu
 Hollywood Heights (2012), Nick at Nite, TeenNick
 Home Before Dark (2020–2021), Apple TV
 Huge (2010), ABC Family
 Hull High (1990), NBC
 I Am Frankie (2017–2018), Nickelodeon
 I Am the Night (2019), TNT
 I Am Not Okay with This (2020), Netflix
 I Know What You Did Last Summer (2021), Amazon Prime Video
 Impulse (2018–2019), YouTube Premium
 In a Heartbeat (2000–2001), Disney Channel
 Invincible (2021–present), Amazon Prime Video
 Insatiable (2018–2019), Netflix
 Jack & Bobby (2004–2005), The WB
 James at 15 (1977–1978), NBC
 Jane by Design (2012), ABC Family
 Joan of Arcadia (2003–2005), CBS
 Julie and the Phantoms (2020), Netflix
 Just Add Magic (2015–2019), Amazon Prime Video
 Just Add Magic: Mystery City (2020), Amazon Prime Video
 Just Deal (2000–2002), NBC
 Just for Kicks (2006), Nickelodeon
 Kaya (2007), MTV
 Kyle XY (2006–2009), ABC Family
 La Brea (2021–present), NBC
 Legacies (2018–2022), The CW
 Life as We Know It (2004–2005), ABC
 Life by Ella (2022–present), Apple TV+
 Life Unexpected (2010–2011), The CW
 Lifestories: Families in Crisis (1992–1996), HBO
 Light as a Feather (2018–2019), Hulu
 Live Through This (2000–2001), MTV
 Locke & Key (2020–2022), Netflix
 Lost in Space (2018–2021), Netflix
 lonelygirl15 (2006–2008), YouTube
 Looking for Alaska (2019), Hulu
 Love, Victor (2020–2022), Hulu
 The Lying Game (2011–2013), ABC Family
 Make It or Break It (2009–2012), ABC Family
 Malibu Shores (1996), NBC
 The Midnight Club (2022), Netflix
 Miracle's Boys (2005), The N
 Motherland: Fort Salem (2020–2022), Freeform
 Ms. Marvel (2022–present), Disney+
 My Dead Ex (2018), go90
 My Life as Liz (2010–2011), MTV
 My So-Called Life (1994–1995), ABC
 The Mystery Files of Shelby Woo (1996–1998), Nickelodeon
 Nancy Drew (2019–present), The CW
 Naomi (2022), The CW
 Never Have I Ever (2020–present), Netflix
 Never Too Young (1965–1966), ABC
 The New People (1969–1970), ABC
 The New Ghostwriter Mysteries (1997), CBS
 The Nine Lives of Chloe King (2011), ABC Family
 The O.C. (2003–2007), Fox
 October Faction (2020), Netflix
 On My Block (2018–2021), Netflix
 One of Us Is Lying (2021–2022), Peacock
 One Tree Hill (2003–2012), The WB, The CW
 Open Heart (2015), TeenNick
 Opposite Sex (2000), Fox
 The Originals (2013–2018), The CW
 The Order (2019–2020), Netflix
 Outer Banks (2020–present), Netflix
 The Outsiders (1990), Fox
 Panic (2021), Amazon Prime Video
 Palmetto Pointe (2005), i
 Paper Girls (2022), Amazon Prime Video
 Party of Five (1994–2000), Fox
 Party of Five (2020), Freeform
 PEN15 (2019–2021), Hulu
 Point Pleasant (2005), Fox
 The Politician (2019–2020), Netflix
 Popular (1999–2001), The WB
 Powerhouse (1982–1983), PBS
 Pretty Little Liars (2010–2017), ABC Family, Freeform
 Pretty Little Liars: Original Sin (2022–present), HBO Max
 Pretty Little Liars: The Perfectionists (2019), Freeform
 Privileged (2008–2009), The CW
 The Quad (2017–2018), BET
 Ravenswood (2013–2014), ABC Family
 Recovery Road (2016), Freeform
 Red Band Society (2014–2015), Fox
 Red Oaks (2015–2017), Amazon Prime Video
 Red Ruby (2019), Brat
 Reign (2013–2017), The CW
 Reservation Dogs (2021–present), FX, Hulu
 Rise (2018), NBC
 Riverdale (2017–present), The CW
 Roswell (1999–2002), The WB, UPN
 Ruby and the Well (2022–present), BYU TV
 Runaways (2017–2019), Hulu
 Sacred Lies (2018–2020), Facebook Watch
 School Spirits (2023–present), Paramount+
 Scream (2015–2016), MTV
 The Secret Circle (2011–2012), The CW
 The Secret Life of the American Teenager (2008–2013), ABC Family
 The Secret of Lost Creek (1992), Disney Channel
 Secrets of Sulphur Springs (2021–present), Disney Channel
 The Secret World of Alex Mack (1994–1998), Nickelodeon
 Shadow and Bone (2021–present), Netflix
 The Sex Lives of College Girls (2021–present), HBO Max
 Shadowhunters (2016–2019), Freeform
 Shameless (2011–2021), Showtime
 The Shannara Chronicles (2016–2017), MTV, Spike
 Side Effects (2014), YouTube
 Sk8 (2001–2002), NBC
 SKAM Austin (2018–2019), Facebook Watch
 Skins (2011), MTV
 Smallville (2001–2011), The WB, The CW
 So Weird (1999–2001), Disney Channel
 The Society (2019), Netflix
 South of Nowhere (2005–2008), The N
 Spinning Out (2020), Netflix
 Spooksville (2013–2014), Hub Network
 Spider-Man: The New Animated Series (2003), MTV
 Stage Fright (2020), Brat
 Star (2016–2019), Fox
 Star-Crossed (2014), The CW
 Stargirl (2020–present), DC Universe, The CW
 Step Up (2018–present), YouTube Red, YouTube Premium, Starz
 Stereoscope (2020), Facebook Watch
 Still Star-Crossed (2017), ABC
 Stranger Things (2016–present), Netflix
 The Summer I Turned Pretty (2022–present), Amazon Prime Video
 Summerland (2004–2005), The WB
 Superboy (1988–1992), syndication
 Superman & Lois (2021–present), The CW
 Supernatural Academy (2022–present), Peacock
 Surfside Girls (2022–present), Apple TV+
 Survive (2020), Quibi
 Swans Crossing (1992), syndication
 Swagger (2021–present), Apple TV+
 Sweet Valley High (1994–1997), Fox
 Sweet/Vicious (2016–2017), MTV
 Switched at Birth (2011–2017), ABC Family, Freeform
 t@gged (2016–2018), go90, Hulu
 Teen Angel (1989), Disney Channel
 Teen Wolf (2011–2017), MTV
 Teenage Bounty Hunters (2020), Netflix
 Theodosia (2022), HBO Max
 Time of Your Life (1999–2000), Fox
 Tiny Pretty Things (2020), Netflix
 Titans (2018–present), DC Universe, HBO Max
 The Tomorrow People (2013–2014), The CW
 Total Eclipse (2018–2020), Brat
 Tribes (1990), Fox
 Tower Prep (2010)‚ Cartoon Network
 Trinkets (2019–2020), Netflix
 Turnt (2018), Facebook Watch
 TV 101 (1988–1989), CBS
 Twisted (2013–2014), ABC Family
 Undressed (1999–2002), MTV
 Unnatural History (2010), Cartoon Network
 The Unsettling (2019), Hulu
 Vampire Academy (2022), Peacock
 The Vampire Diaries (2009–2017), The CW
 Veronica Mars (2004–2007), UPN, The CW
 Vikki RPM (2017), Nickelodeon Latin America
 The Walking Dead: World Beyond (2020–2021), AMC
 Warrior Nun (2020), Netflix
 Wayne (2019), YouTube Premium
 We Are Who We Are (2020), HBO
 Wednesday (2022–present), Netflix
 When the Streetlights Go On (2020), Quibi
 The White Shadow (1978–1981), CBS
 Whiz Kids (1983–1984), CBS
 Wildfire (2005–2008), ABC Family
 The Wilds (2020–2022), Amazon Prime Video
 The Winchesters (2022–present), The CW
 Wireless (2020), Quibi
 Wolf Pack (2023–present), Paramount+
 The Wonder Years (1988–1993), ABC
 Yellowjackets (2021–present), Showtime
 Young Americans (2000), The WB
 Youth & Consequences (2018), YouTube Red
 Zac & Mia (2017–2019), go90, Hulu
 Zoe Valentine (2019), Brat

Venezuela 
 A puro corazón (2015–2016), Televen
 A todo corazón (1997–1998), Venevisión
  (2009), Venevisión
  (2011), Boomerang
  (2004), Venevisión
  (2005–2006), Venevisión
  (2011), Venevisión
 Hoy te vi (1998–1999), RCTV
  (2008), TVes
  (2011), TVes
 NPS: No puede ser (2011), Venevisión, Boomerang
 Pura pinta (2007), RCTV
 ¡Qué clase de amor! (2009), Venevisión
 Somos tú y yo (2007–2009), Venevisión, Boomerang
 Túkiti, crecí de una (2006–2007), RCTV

Other countries 
 Bangladesh – Happy Lodge (2019), Boishakhi TV
 Cóte d'Ivoire – MTV Shuga: Babi (2019–2021) YouTube, RTI
 Czech Republic –  (2011), ČT1, Česká televize
 Ecuador –  (2000–2001), Ecuavisa
 Estonia – Ühikarotid (2010–2012), Kanal 2
 Jamaica – Real Friends (2016–2019), TVJ
 Lithuania –  (2008–2009), LRT
 Malaysia –  (2016), TV3
 Slovakia – Nový život (2020–2021), TV JOJ
 Vietnam –  (2004–2008), HTV
 Zambia – Tikula (2022), SKY Girls Zed

See also 
 Teen drama
 Teen sitcom  (List of teen sitcoms)
 Teen films  (List of teen films)
 Teen pop
 Teen magazine  (List of teen magazines)

References

 
Lists of television series by genre
Works about adolescence
Dynamic lists
Adolescence-related lists